Mordellistena flavospinosa is a beetle in the genus Mordellistena of the family Mordellidae. It was described in 1911 by Hubenthal.

References

flavospinosa
Beetles described in 1911